Andrew Foulis (171218 September 1775) was a Scottish printer, brother of Robert Foulis. They worked in partnership as printers to the University of Glasgow publishing many books in Latin and Greek.

Biography
Andrew Foulis was the son of a Glasgow barber and maltman (brewer), named Andrew Faulls (or Faulds).

Andrew Foulis, was intended to be trained for the church, and hence received the better education than Robert Foulis, who was intending to take up his father's trade as a barber. However, Robert still sat in on classes at the University of Glasgow and received an unofficial education and a formal mentor from Francis Hutcheson. Both Andrew and Robert had changed their surname from Faulls to Foulis in the 1730s. Robert shared a passion with Andrew Foulis for knowledge and found the way for them to contribute to academia beyond a professorship; also, the professor Francis Hutcheson was the first person to encourage Robert to take up an interest in Book selling and printing. Robert had initially started the press, however Andrew Foulis had joined in on the venture to form a partnership after spending 1738 and 1739 in England and France together. In Paris, Andrew and Robert had found some extraordinary books that they had purchased, imported back to England and then sold them for a profit; hence the beginning of their lucrative and prestigious partnership. Andrew and Robert's enterprise would continue for the next 30 years.

Andrew Foulis had studied at the University of Glasgow with a focus in Humanity (Latin). Foulis would later teach Latin, Greek, and French in Glasgow. In 1738, Andrew and Robert Foulis were traveling; when they arrived in Paris, they were introduced to well known expatriate Scottish writer Chevalier Andrew Ramsay (Ramsay is known for his tutoring of Prince James Francis Edward Stuart's two sons in Rome including Prince Charles Edward Stuart). The acquaintance to Ramsay had led the Foulis brothers to the most fine and exclusive Parisian libraries, of which a good number of the contents had become the Foulis brothers' initial success that had launched their book dealing business.

In 1741, Foulis' brother Robert had established the bookshop at Glasgow; this was a full ten years prior to John Smith opening his first shop in the city. The brothers didn't take too long to start publishing their own books. Within the first year, all the printing for the Foulis publishing had to be outsourced to other printers, but by their second year they had acquired their own printing press and were able to handle all of the publishing needs in house. Shortly thereafter, the Foulis brothers' printing and book shop became the University of Glasgow's Printer. Their publications were achieving high repute for being of great quality printing and publishing in mainly the classical and literary works.

Their unique printing style had found an identity with Alexander Wilson's type faces. Wilson had helped the Foulis Press' publication reach the beauty and sophistication that was so highly reported by their customers, the more notable type face that Wilson supplied the Foulis brothers was Scotch Roman. In 1748, Wilson had been made the University of Glasgow's Type founder and moved his foundry there until it was shutdown in 1834.

Andrew and Robert Foulis had dominated the book trade in Glasgow during this period. Their more notable achievements were those of their internationally renowned editions of Homer's classics "The Iliad" and "The Odyssey" from 1756 to 1758. The brothers were extolled over their famous prints and editions; they were even complimented with being referred to as "the Elzevirs of Britain". The Elzevirs were a Dutch family that had a printing press and published as well as sold books during the 17th and 18th centuries.

The brothers had also published more practical and less extravagant editions of the classics and works from contemporary writers, including their mentor Francis Hutcheson. According to Richard B. Sher and Andrew Hooks the brothers had a goal and vision that they hoped their publishing would fulfill; "to translate into print culture the values of the classical, aesthetic, moralistic, Hutchesonian Enlightenment in Glasgow."

Andrew Foulis and his brother Robert were not just publishers of academia's works—as it was concerned in Glasgow—but also enthusiasts of them. James Boswell had recorded that the famous contemporary literary figure Samuel Johnson had visited Glasgow and was humbly taken in as an honored and famous guest by the Foulis brothers. Boswell stated that Johnson was rather upset with his two hosts—Andrew and Robert Foulis—by them simply arguing with Johnson and answering back.

The vast majority of the Foulis Press' books were intended for scholars but some of their books had also been made to print specifically for collectors whom wanted select books.

Andrew and Robert Foulis continued with bringing an eclectic range of edition to the classics. The Foulis Presses continued to import rare editions of the classics and purchase manuscripts with promising upside from mainland Europe and in turn sold them to the local scholars and collectors. They printed editions of books from the very expensive fine paper prints to the very novel and practical, even miniature editions. The Foulis Print editions of the classic books were sought after for being well edited, simple and of practical size.

Their publications were famous both for beauty and accuracy; the 554 works they printed included editions of Horace, Homer, Milton, and Thomas Gray. Although the prestige of their typography waned, it nonetheless represented high achievement in a style of the time. Their typefaces, the most enduring of which is Scotch Roman, were designed by Alexander Wilson.

He is buried with Robert in the Ramshorn Cemetery on Ingram Street. Due to a widening of Ingram Street the graves now lie beneath the pavement but are still marked, using their initials in the paving.

Notes

References

External links
 The University of Guelph Library, Archival and Special Collections, has a collection of 400 Foulis Press publications. All records are catalogued and accessible at its introductory page 

Scottish printers
Scottish publishers (people)
People associated with the University of Glasgow
1712 births
1775 deaths
People of the Scottish Enlightenment